The World Chart Express chart was a show played on MTV Europe every Saturday, repeating then on Sundays and Fridays. It was a top ten chart, consisting of popular songs across the world. It was one of the few charts that actually plays music sung in different languages other than English, representing what's truly popular in each country.

It had an Indian version which was played on a satellite TV network called Tata Sky for 5 weeks.

Music chart television shows
MTV original programming